Chelsea Clark is a Canadian actress having arose to notability playing Esme Song in four seasons of Degrassi: Next Class, and Norah in the Netflix  streaming TV series Ginny & Georgia.

Personal life
Clark attended the University of Toronto. She has competed at the international level in dragon boat racing.

Career 
Clark first appeared on television in an episode of Rookie Blue  in 2010, and as Stacey in Life with Boys  in 2011. She landed a main starring role as Esme Song for four seasons of the classic Canadian series Degrassi: Next Class  from 2016 to 2017. During that time, Clark was nominated for "Best Series Regular or Leading Actress in a TV Series 16 Years & Over" at the 2017 Joey Awards for her role in Degrassi: Next Class  Clark was nominated for and won "Best actress in a short film" at the 2017 Joey Awards for her performance in the short film Blue Heart Emoji.

In 2019, Clark was part of the ensemble for the Winnifred Jong directed comedy web series Tokens, which was nominated for best ensemble at the 18th Annual ACTRA Awards in Toronto.

In 2021, Clark played Norah, a member of the MANG group (Max, Abby, Norah, Ginny) in the Netflix television series Ginny & Georgia.

Clark played a lead role in the Lenin M. Sivam directed thriller The Protector, which premiered at the Fantasia Festival on July 28, 2022.

Clark stars in five episodes of the 2022 mini-series Ezra; she was also credited as a producer, writer, and director.

Filmography

Film

Television

Awards and nominations

References

External links 

21st-century Canadian actresses
Canadian actresses of Filipino descent
Actresses from Toronto
Canadian television actresses
Canadian film actresses
Living people
Year of birth missing (living people)